Boiga ceylonensis (Sri Lanka cat snake) is a species of rear-fanged, mildly venomous, nocturnal, arboreal colubrid snake endemic to Sri Lanka.

Description 
This is a thin-bodied, elongate, slim, tree snake. Taxonomic features: Dorsal Scales in 19 rows, oblique ; scales along the vertebral row much enlarged, and at mid body nearly as broad as long. Ventrals scales 217–237; the anals are undivided, subcaudals 95–109. The colour is brown or greyish above, with a series of blackish transverse cross bands ; nape with a blackish blotch, or three blackish longitudinal streaks, or a transverse bar ; a more or less distinct brown crown marking on top of head and a thick streak from the eye to the angle of the mouth ; lower parts yellowish, dotted with brown, usually with a lateral series of small brown dots. They are about 4 feet long from tip to tip with the tail 10 inches.

Distribution range 
It is an endemic species to Sri Lanka. Previously believed to occur in the Western Ghats of India, but was falsified by recent studies.

Interaction with humans 
This snake frequently ventures into human dwellings in search of prey such as geckos. It has a somewhat aggressive disposition and boldly strikes out when disturbed or cornered.

See also 
 Boiga barnesii

Notes

References 
 Günther, A. 1858 Catalogue of Colubrine snakes of the British Museum. London, I – XVI, 1 – 281
 Wall, Frank 1921 Ophidia Taprobanica or the Snakes of Ceylon. Colombo Mus. (H. R. Cottle, government printer), Colombo. xxii, 581 pages
 GANESH, S.R., N.S. ACHYUTHAN, S.R. CHANDRAMOULI & GERNOT VOGEL (2020). Taxonomic revision of the Boiga ceylonensis group (Serpentes: Colubridae): re-examination of type specimens, redefinition of nominate taxa and an updated key.4779 (3): 301–332.

ceylonensis
Reptiles of Sri Lanka
Reptiles described in 1858
Taxa named by Albert Günther